Polesworth Abbey was a Benedictine nunnery in Polesworth, North Warwickshire, England.

Abbey
It was founded in the 9th century by St. Modwena and King Egbert. The first abbess was Edgytha (daughter of King Egbert, now St. Editha).

The site of the Abbey is a Scheduled Ancient Monument, although apart from the church and the gatehouse and the restored ruins of the cloister very little remains visible. The 12th-century Abbey church, now the parish church of St Editha, is a Grade II* listed building. The 14th-century gatehouse is both a Grade II* listed building  and a Scheduled Ancient Monument. It has recently been restored and renovated to provide apartments available for rent.

Parish church

Following the Dissolution of the Monasteries in 1536, the Abbey was granted by Henry VIII to Francis Goodere of St Albans, Hertfordshire in 1544. Goodere dismantled many of the Abbey buildings to provide stone for a new manor house (Polesworth Hall) which he built on the site. Later Sir Henry Goodere was a patron of the arts and leader of the Polesworth Group of poets, which included his protégé Michael Drayton. Polesworth Hall was demolished before 1868 and the Vicarage was built on the site. The abbey now functions as the Church of England parish church of Polesworth.

Organ
The church contains a three manual pipe organ by Taylor of Leicester. It was originally installed in 1912 in St Michael & All Angels' Church, Leicester. A specification of the organ can be found on the National Pipe Organ Register.

See also
List of English abbeys, priories and friaries serving as parish churches

References

Other sources
   A History of the County of Warwickshire, Volume 4 (1947) from British History online
  Polesworth Abbey by Warwickshire Timetrail.

External links

 Polesworth Abbey
 Polesworth Abbey Choir
 Polesworth Abbey Arts

Christian monasteries established in the 9th century
Anglo-Saxon monastic houses
Monasteries in Warwickshire
Benedictine nunneries in England
Grade II* listed buildings in Warwickshire
Scheduled monuments in Warwickshire
9th-century establishments in England
1530s disestablishments in England
Church of England church buildings in Warwickshire
Polesworth